Mégantic can refer to:

 Lac-Mégantic, Quebec, a municipality in southeastern Quebec formerly called Mégantic
 Lac-Mégantic derailment, a train derailment that occurred 6 July 2013
 Lac Mégantic, a lake in southeastern Quebec
 Mont Mégantic, a mountain in southeastern Quebec
 Mont Mégantic Observatory, an observatory located at Mont Megantic, Quebec
 Mont-Mégantic National Park, a Quebec provincial park surrounding Mount Megantic
 4843 Mégantic, the asteroid Mégantic, 4843th registered, named after the Mont Mégantic Observatory
 SS Megantic (1908), a White Star Lines passenger ship named for Lake Mégantic, Québec

Canadian federal electoral districts
 Mégantic—L'Érable, a Canadian federal electoral district
 Mégantic (federal electoral district), a former Canadian federal electoral district
 Frontenac—Mégantic, a former Canadian federal electoral district
 Mégantic—Frontenac, a former Canadian federal electoral district

Quebec provincial electoral districts
 Mégantic-Compton, a Quebec provincial electoral district
 Mégantic (provincial electoral district), a former Quebec provincial electoral district

See also
 Notre Dame and Mégantic Mountains, a physiographic province of the larger Appalachian division
 Megantic outlaw, the folk hero Donald Morrison, an outlaw
 Lac Megantic (disambiguation)